Nonotherium is an extinct genus of toxodontine toxodontid from the Montehermosan Brochero Formation of Argentina. It was described by Castellanos in 1942.

References 

Toxodonts
Pliocene mammals of South America
Chapadmalalan
Montehermosan
Neogene Argentina
Fossils of Argentina
Fossil taxa described in 1942
Prehistoric placental genera